The French Open is a Grand Slam tier tennis tournament held in Paris at the Stade Roland Garros in the administrative district of XVIe.  The tournament was first held in 1891 for the men and 1897 for the women's, and has only ceased being played during the two world wars.  This tournament first became part of the Open Era in 1968, which was the first major tournament to open up to professional tennis players in their competition.

The men who have reached the final at least four times during the Open Era are: Björn Borg, Guillermo Vilas, Ivan Lendl, Mats Wilander, Rafael Nadal, Roger Federer, and Novak Djokovic. Borg won all six of his finals from 1974 to 1981. Vilas won only one of his four finals from 1975 to 1982. Lendl and Wilander dominated the 1980s, with at least one appearing in the final each year from 1981 to 1988; both men won three out of five finals. Nadal has won all 14 of his finals from 2005 to the present day; he has not appeared in the final in 2009, 2015, 2016 and 2021 only. Federer has appeared in five finals from 2006 to 2011, winning only one and missing the final in 2010. Djokovic has appeared in six finals from 2012 to 2021, winning two. Federer won the career Grand Slam at this tournament in 2009, while Djokovic won the career Grand Slam at this tournament in 2016, and a second career Grand Slam in 2021.

The women who have reached the final at least four times during the Open Era are: Chris Evert, Martina Navratilova, Steffi Graf, Arantxa Sánchez Vicario, Monica Seles, Justine Henin, and Serena Williams. Evert won seven of her nine finals from 1973 through 1986. Navratilova appeared in six finals; her first in 1975, then five from 1982 through 1987. Graf won seven of her nine finals. From 1987 through 1996, she made the final each year except 1991 and 1994; she won her last final in 1999. Her 1988 win was part of her calendar-year Grand Slam. Sánchez Vicario appeared in six finals from 1989 through 1998, winning three. Seles won three straight finals from 1990 to 1992; she was stabbed in 1993 and only appeared in one more final (1998). Henin appeared in four finals from 2003 to 2007, winning all four and missing the final in 2004. Williams appeared in four finals; her first in 2002, then three from 2013 through 2016.

Men

The French Open Men's Singles finals have been competed in by 52 competitors from 22 separate nationalities over the 54 year time period this event has been staged.  The most dominant finalist nations are Spain and Sweden, other successful competing nations are the United States, Czechoslovakia, and Argentina.
* = Champion

Most recent final

Multiple-time opponents in the Open Era

Most consecutive finals in the Open Era

Bolded years^ indicates active or current streak

Women

The French Open Women's Singles finals have consisted of 54 competitors from 18 nationalities in the 54 meetings that have taken place at the event.  The eras of dominance are the following: United States and Yugoslavia in different eras, Australia in the 1970s, Germany and Spain in the 1980s and 1990s, and Belgium and Russia in the 2000s.
* = Champion

Most recent final

Multiple-time opponents in the Open Era

Most consecutive finals in the Open Era

Bolded years^ indicates active or current streak

Notes
 Martina Navratilova was born in Czechoslovakia but lost her citizenship in 1975. She became a United States citizen in 1981. Her Czech citizenship was restored in 2008.
 Monica Seles was born in Yugoslavia but became a United States citizen in 1994.

See also

List of Australian Open singles finalists during the Open Era
List of Wimbledon singles finalists during the Open Era
List of US Open singles finalists during the Open Era

References

External links
French Open Drawsheets

Open Era